= Guillaume Imbert =

Guillaume Imbert de Boudeaux (1744 – 19 May 1803) was a French man of letters.

Born in Limoges, Imbert was forced by his family to enter the Benedictine Order. After constant protest, he left the order as soon as he could, and left his monastery.

He then gave vent to his taste for politics and literary criticism, publishing periodicals that led to his imprisonment in the Bastille on three occasions.

Fearing further imprisonment, Imbert emigrated to Neuwied, in Rhenish Prussia, where he collaborated in the publication of Francois Metra's secret literary correspondence.

He returned to France in 1790, where he ended his days in Paris.

== Works ==
- État présent de l’Espagne et de la Nation espagnole, 1770.
- Dissertation sur l’Origine de l’Imprimerie en Angleterre (translation of Conyers Middleton's work in English) (London and Paris, 1775).
- Correspondance littéraire secrète, published each week between 4 June 1774 and October 1785.
- La Philosophie de la Guerre, extrait des Mémoires du général Henri Lloyd, trad. par un officier français (novel), 1790.
- Anecdotes du dix-huitième siècle (London, 1783–1785).
- La Chronique scandaleuse, ou mémoires pour servir à l’histoire des mœurs de la génération présente (Paris, 1783).
- Mémoire politique et militaire sur la Défense et l’Invasion de la Grande-Bretagne, tr. from H. Lloyd's work in English (Limoges and Paris).

== Bibliography ==
- Jean Chrétien Ferdinand Hoefer, Nouvelle biographie générale, t. XXV (Paris: Firmin-Didot, 1855) p. 826.
